Several non-governmental armed terrorist groups were involved in the Algerian Civil War, most against the government:
 Armed Islamic Group of Algeria (GIA)
 Islamic Front for Armed Jihad (FIDA)
 Islamic Salvation Army (AIS)
 Salafist Group for Preaching and Combat (GSPC)
 Takfir wal-Hijra (minor)

Government Loyalists :
 Organisation of Young Free Algerians (OJAL)

Algeria history-related lists
 
Algerian Civil War
Algeria